The Henry Clay Mills House was a historic house at 425 North 15th Street in Van Buren, Arkansas.  This modest frame house was built in 1892 by Henry Clay Mills, an African-American former slave turned businessman.  Mills was born into slavery in 1847, and after the American Civil War worked for many years as a laborer on a plantation near Mulberry.  He eventually developed a moving and shipping business in Van Buren, typifying advancement of African-Americans of the period from agricultural to non-agricultural economic opportunities.

The house was listed on the National Register of Historic Places in 1977.  It has apparently been demolished, and was delisted in 2018.

See also
National Register of Historic Places listings in Crawford County, Arkansas

References

Houses on the National Register of Historic Places in Arkansas
Houses completed in 1892
Houses in Crawford County, Arkansas
National Register of Historic Places in Crawford County, Arkansas
Buildings and structures in Van Buren, Arkansas
Former National Register of Historic Places in Arkansas
Demolished buildings and structures in Arkansas
1892 establishments in Arkansas